Carenum elegans is a species of ground beetle in the subfamily Scaritinae, tribe Scaritini and subtribe Carenina. It was described by William John Macleay in 1864 from Port Denison, Western Australia.

References 

elegans
Beetles described in 1864
Beetles of Australia
Arthropods of Western Australia